Navy is a census designated place in Fairfax County, Virginia, United States.

It first appeared as a CDP in the 2020 Census with a population of 4,327.

Demographics

2020 census

Note: the US Census treats Hispanic/Latino as an ethnic category. This table excludes Latinos from the racial categories and assigns them to a separate category. Hispanics/Latinos can be of any race.

References

Census-designated places in Fairfax County, Virginia
Census-designated places in Virginia